Expenditures by Canadian universities on scientific research and development accounted for about 40% of all spending on scientific research and development in Canada in 2006.

Research in the natural and social sciences in Canada, with a few important exceptions, is almost exclusively funded by the Canadian taxpayer and is distributed to universities by five important federal funding agencies, the Natural Sciences and Engineering Research Council (NSERC), the Canadian Institutes of Health Research (CIHR), and the Social Sciences and Humanities Research Council of Canada (SSHRC). Additional monies are also provided by the Canada Research Chairs organization, which provides financing for the staffing of research personnel at Canadian universities and the Canada Foundation for Innovation, which supports the acquisition of scientific research infrastructure by Canadian universities, colleges, research hospitals, and non-profit research institutions.

In 2006, total spending on scientific and industrial research in Canada amounted to C$28.067 billion or about 2 percent of GDP. In 2006, Canadian universities spent C$10.890 billion on research and development, representing about 40 percent of all R&D spending in Canada and about .66 percent of Canada's GDP.

Below are the names of those university institutions that carry out both natural and social science research, although the emphasis here is on the former. The largest part of funding from NSERC, is received by 15 universities, not surprisingly the largest in the country, which have formed an association named the U15. The list below ranks the members of this group in order of NSERC grant size. A number of thematically specialized virtual university research organizations, the Networks of Excellence, have been established and are listed here. Also included are the names of some particular research organizations and projects notable for their large size or for other characteristics. This is followed by a brief description of the expenditures on scientific research and development by sector. Finally the list includes those support organizations that fund scientific research at the university level or contribute to its success in other ways.

U15 largest Canadian research universities

University of Toronto 

Toronto, Ontario.
   
NSERC Funding 2003: C$M 54,264

Number of Canada Research Chairs – 245

Research institutes
Natural science research
 Institute for Aerospace Studies
 Canadian Institute for Theoretical Astrophysics
Centre for the Analysis of Genome Evolution and Function (CAGEF)
 Terrence Donnelly Centre for Cellular and Biomolecular Research
 Canadian Drosophila Microarray Centre
 Centre for Environment
 The Fields Institute for Research in Mathematical Sciences
 Proteomics Research Centre
 Engineering Research
 Centre for Advanced Coating Technologies
 Centre for Applied Power Electronics
 Institute of Biomaterials and Biomedical Engineering
 Canadian Aeronautics and Space Institute
 Emerging Communications Technology Institute
 Energenius Centre for Advanced Nanotechnology
 Hitachi Survey Research Centre
 Intelligent Transportation Systems
 Institute for Knowledge Innovation and Technology
 Centre for Landscape Research InterNetwork
 Lassonde Institute (Engineering Geoscience)
 Centre for Microelectronics Assembly and Packaging
 Molecular Design and Information Technology Center (MDIT)
 Centre for Nuclear Engineering
 Positron Emission Tomography Centre
 Pulp and Paper Centre
Medical research
 Sunnybrook Research Institute
 Institute of Medical Science
 Sunnybrook Centre for studies in Aging
 Banting and Best Diabetes Centre
 Centre for Evidence-Based Medicine
 Centre for Health Promotion
 Heart & Stroke/Richard Lewar Centre for Cardiovascular Research
 Institute for Human Development, Life Course and Aging
 Centre for International Health, Faculty of Medicine
 R. Samuel McLaughlin Centre for Molecular Medicine
 Centre for the Neurobiology of Stress
 Centre for research in Neurodegenerative Diseases
 U of T Centre for the Study of Pain
 Sleep Medicine and Circadian Biology
Social science research
 Joint Centre for Bioethics
 Clarkson Centre for Business Effectiveness and Board Effectiveness
 Capital Markets Institute
 CERIS – The Ontario Metropolis Centre
 Institute for Competitiveness & Prosperity
 Centre of Criminology
 Centre for research in Education (Medical)
 International Centre for Educational Change
 G8 Information Centre
 Institute for the History and Philosophy of Science and Technology
 Centre for Industrial Relations
 Centre for research into Information Studies
 Centre for Innovation Law and Policy
 Centre for Integrative and Anti-Racism Studies
 Institute for International Business
 Centre for International Studies
 Knowledge Media and Design Institute
 Laidlaw Centre (Institute of Child Study)
 Centre for Management of Technology and Entrepreneurship
 Centre for Media and Culture in Education
 Centre for Modern Language
 Multimedia Centre for Learning in the Humanities
 Munk Centre for International Studies
 Institute for Policy Analysis
 Centre de Recherches en éducation Franco-ontarienne
 Centre for Applied Social Research
 Atkinson Centre for Society and Child Development
 Imperial Oil Centre for Studies in Science, Mathematics and Technology Education
 Centre for Study of Education and Work
 Centre for the Study of the United States
 Centre for Teacher Development
 Centre for Technology and Social Development
 Transformative Learning Centre
 Centre for Urban and Community Studies
 Centre for Research in Women's Health
 Institute for Women's Studies and Gender Studies
 Centre for Women's Studies in Education

University of British Columbia 

Vancouver, British Columbia.

NSERC Funding 2003: C$M 43,004

Number of Canada Research Chairs – 148

Research institutes
Land & Food Systems
Avian Research Centre
UBC Dairy Education and Research Centre
UBC Centre for Aquaculture and Environmental Research (CAER)
Department of Fisheries and Oceans (DFO)
 Soil-Water Environmental Laboratory
 UBC Botanical Garden and Centre for Plant Research
 Wine Research Centre
Natural Science and Engineering
 Institute for Aboriginal Health
 Institute for Applied Mathematics (IAM)
 Canadian Institute for Advanced Research
 Institute of Health Promotion Research
 Institute of Mental Health
 Pacific Institute for the Mathematical Sciences (PIMS)
 Peter Wall Institute for Advanced Studies
 Rick Hansen Institute (RHI)
 Robotics & Intelligent Systems (IRIS)
 Sustainable Development Research Institute (SDRI)
 Institute for Systems Biology (ISB)
Social Science
 Institute of Asian Research
 BC Children's Hospital Research Institute
 English Language Institute (ELI)
 Institute for European Studies
 Human Early Learning Partnership
 Liu Institute for Global Issues
 Institute for Shastri Indo-Canadian Institute (SICI)

UBC also operates 65 research centres.

University of Alberta 

Edmonton, Alberta.

NSERC Funding 2003 C$M 36,291

Number of Canada Research Chairs – 100

Centres and institutes
Agricultural, Life and Environmental Sciences
 Alberta Poultry Research Centre
 Alberta Veterinary Research Institute (AVRI)
 Centre for Enhanced Forest Management (EFM)
 Dairy Research and Technology Centre (DRTC)
 Environmental Research and Studies Centre
 Material Culture Institute (MCI)
Engineering
 Alberta Centre for Surface Engineering and Science
 Construction Research Institute for Canada (CIRC)
 Imperial Oil Centre for Oil Sands Innovation
Health Sciences Council
 Alberta Centre on Aging
 Alberta Institute for Human Nutrition
 Community-University Partnership (CUP)
 The John Dossetor Health Ethics Centre
Medicine and Dentistry
 Alberta Asthma Centre
 Alberta Centre for Prions and Protein Folding Diseases
 Alberta Diabetes Research Institute
 Alberta Institute for Viral Immunology (AIVI)
 Alberta Peptide Institute (API)
 Alberta Transplant Applied Genomics Centre (ATAGC)
 Canadian VIGOUR Centre
 Centre for Health Evidence
 Centre for Neuroscience
 Digestive Health Care Centre for Colon Cancer (DHCCC)
 Glaxo Wellcome Heritage Research Institute
 Magnetic Resonance Diagnostics Centre (MRDC)
 Muttart Diabetes Research & Training Centre
 Perinatal Research Group
 Women and Children's Health Research Institute (WCHRI)
Nursing
 Institute for Philosophical Nursing Research
 International Institute for Qualitative Methodology
 International Nursing Centre
Pharmacy and Pharmaceutical Sciences
 Centre for Community Pharmacy Research and Interdisciplinary Studies (c/COMPRIS)
 Noujaim Institute
School of Public Health
 Alberta Centre for Injury Control and Research
 Centre for Health Promotion Studies
Rehabilitation Medicine
 Centre for Studies in Clinical Education (CSCE)
 Institute for Stuttering Treatment and Research (ISTAR)
 Rehabilitation Research Centre
Science
 Alberta Centre for Earth Observation Sciences (CEOS)
 Alberta Cooperative Conservation Research Unit
 Alberta Ingenuity Centre for Carbohydrate Science
 Alberta Ingenuity Centre for Machine Learning
 Applied Mathematics Institute
 Centre for Mathematical Biology
 Centre for Particle Physics
 Institute for Geophysical Research (IGR)
 Institute for Space Science, Exploration and Technology (ISSET)
 Statistics Centre
 Theoretical Physics Institute

McGill University 

Montreal, Quebec.

Number of Canada Research Chairs – 133
Number of Canada Excellence Research Chairs – 2

NSERC Funding 2003: C$M 34,984

Research facilities

 Downtown Campus – Faculty of Science and Faculty of Engineering

Mathematics, Natural Sciences and Engineering:

 Bone and Periodontal Research, Centre for
 Advanced Materials, McGill Institute for (MIAM)
 Biodiversity Science, Quebec Centre for
 Bioinformatics, McGill Centre for
 Brain, Language and Music, Centre for Research on (CRBLM)
 Cell Imaging and Analysis Network (CIAN)
 Comparative Medicine and Animal Resources Centre
 Developmental Biology Research Initiative (DBRI)
 Experimental Ecology and Evolution, Laboratory for (LE3)
 High Energy Physics, Centre for
 Institut des sciences mathématiques de Montréal (ISM)
 Intelligent Machines, Centre for (CIM)
 Music, Media and Technology, Centre for Interdisciplinary Research in (CIRMMT)
 Pain, Alan Edwards Centre for Research on
 Physics of Materials, Centre for the (CPM)
 Self-Assembled Chemical Structures, Centre for (CSACS)
 Sustainability in Engineering and Design, Trottier Institute for 
 Aerospace Engineering, McGill Institute for
 High Field NMR Facility
 Nanotools Microfab Laboratory
 Phytotron
 Redpath Museum
 Sheldon Biotechnology Centre
 Advanced Systems & Technologies on Communications, Centre for (SYTAcom)
 Water Resources Management, Brace Centre for
 McGill Metals Processing Centre
 Trottier Institute for Sustainability in Engineering and Design (TISED)

Downtown Campus – Faculty of Medicine and Faculty of Dentistry

 Alan Edwards Centre for Research on Pain
 Anesthesia Research Unit
 Artificial Cells & Organs Research Centre
 Biomedical Ethics Unit
 Centre for Advanced Bone and Periodontal Research
 Centre for Applied Mathematics in Bioscience and Medicine (CAMBAM)
 Centre for Bone and Periodontal Research
 Centre for Bioinformatics
 Centre for Biorecognition and Biosensors
 Centre of Genomics and Policy
 Centre for Research in Neuroscience
 Centre for Nursing Research
 Centre for Research on Brain, Language and Music
 Centre for Research in Reproduction and Development
 Centre for Structural Biology (GRASP Research Group)
 Comparative Medicine and Animal Resources Centre
 Cystic Fibrosis Translational Research Centre (CFTRc)
 Douglas Mental Health University Institute
 Facility for Electron Microscopy Research (FEMR)
 Institute for Health and Social Policy
 J.D. MacLean Centre for Tropical Diseases
 Lady Davis Institute for Medical Research (McGill AIDS Centre)
 Ludmer Centre for Neuroinformatics & Mental Health
 McGill Centre for Studies in Aging
 McGill International TB Centre
 McGill Centre for Translational Research in Cancer
 McGill Centre for the Convergence of Health and Economics (MCCHE)
 McGill University and Genome Quebec Innovation Centre
 Microbiome and Disease Tolerance Centre
 Montreal Neurological Institute-Hospital
 Research Institute MUHC
 Rosalind and Morris Goodman Cancer Research Centre
 Steinberg Centre for Simulation and Interactive Learning
 The Network for Oral and Bone Health Research

Macdonald campus

 Bioresource Engineering Machine Shop
 CT Scanning Laboratory for Agricultural and Environmental Research
 Ecological Agriculture Projects
 Fermentation and Bioprocessing Laboratory
 Flow Cytometry Core Facility
 Lyman Entomological Museum and Research Laboratory
 Macdonald Campus Farm
 J.S. Marshall Radar Observatory
 Mary Emily Clinical Nutrition Unit
 McGill University Herbarium
 Morgan Arboretum
 Pilot Plant
 Plant Science Field Research Facilities
 Plant Science Research Greenhouses and Phytorium
 Soil and Plant Analysis Laboratory
 The Trace Metal Analysis Laboratory

Off campus
 Bellairs Research Institute (Barbados)
 Gault Nature Reserve (Mont-Saint-Hilaire)
 Mont-Saint-Hilaire Nature Conservation Centre
 McGill Arctic Research Station
 McGill Sub-Arctic Research Station
 Molson Nature Reserve (Ste-Anne de Bellevue)
 Wilder and Helen Penfield Nature Reserve (Lake Memphrémagog)
 Interuniversity/ Interinstitutional(based at McGill or elsewhere)
 CLUMEQ Supercomputer Centre
 Coriolis II (Rimouski)
 Huntsman Marine Science Centre
 McGill University and Genome Quebec Innovation Centre
 Pulp and Paper Research Institute – Canada (PAPRICAN)
 Quebec Interuniversity Centre for Social Statistics (QICSS)
 Centre for the Study of Learning and Performance (CSLP)

University of Waterloo 

Waterloo, Ontario

NSERC Funding 2003: C$M 29,763

Number of Canada Research Chairs – 48

Research centres and institutes
 Canadian Centre of Arts & Technology (CCAT)
 Canadian Centre for Cultural Innovation (CCCI)
 Centre for Accounting Research & Education (CARE)
 Centre for Advanced Studies in Finance (CASF)
 Centre for Advancement of Trenchless Technologies at Waterloo (CATT)
 Centre for Applied Cryptographic Research (CACR)
 Centre for Business, Entrepreneurship & Technology (CBET)
 Centre for Computational Mathematics in Industry & Commerce (CCMIC)
 Centre for Contact Lens Research (CCLR)
 Centre for Cultural Management (CCM)
 Centre for Education in Mathematics & Computing (CEMC)
 Centre for Mental Health Research (CMHR)
 Centre for Molecular Beams & Laser Chemistry
 Centre for Theoretical Neuroscience
 Heritage Resource Centre
 Institute for Computer Research (ICR)
 Institute for Innovation Research (IIR)
 Institute for Polymer Research (IPR)
 Institute for Quantitative Finance & Insurance (IQFI)
 Institute for Quantum Computing (IQC)
 Institute for Risk Research (IRR)
 Institute for Vision Science & Technology (IVST)
 Institute of Biochemistry & Molecular Biology
 Institute of Insurance and Pension Research (IIPR)
 Integrated Centre for Visualization, Design & Manufacturing (ICVDM)
 Mid-Size City Research Centre (MCRC)
 Nortel Networks Institute for Advanced Information Technology (NNI)
 Schlegel – UW Research Institute for Aging (RIA)
 Survey Research Centre (SRC)
 Waterloo Centre for the Advancement of Co-operative Education (WatCACE)
 Waterloo Centre for Atmospheric Sciences
 Waterloo Centre for Automotive Research (WatCAR)
 Waterloo Centre for German Studies
 Waterloo Institute for Groundwater Research (WIGR)
 Waterloo Institute for Health Informatics Research (WIHIR)
 University of Waterloo Management of Integrated Manufacturing Systems Research Group (WATMIMS)

Université Laval 

Québec, Québec

NSERC Funding 2003: C$M 28,128

Number of Canada Research Chairs – 80

Network of Centres of Excellence
 ArcticNet
 Geoide
 Canadian Institute for Photonic Innovations

Instituts de recherche
 Institut des nutraceutiques et des aliments fonctionnels (INAF)
 Institut d'éthique appliquée (IDÉA)
 Institut d'études anciennes (IEA)
 Institut Hydro-Québec en environnement, développement et société (IHQEDS)
 Institut québécois des hautes études internationales (IQHEI)
 Institut sur le patrimoine culturel (IPAC)
 Institut sur le vieillissement et la participation sociale des aînés (IVPSA)
 Institut Technologies de l'Information et Sociétés (ITIS)

Centres de recherche
 Centre d'analyse des politiques publiques (CAPP)
 Centre de recherche en aménagement et développement (CRAD)
 Centre de recherche en biologie de la reproduction (CRBR)
 Centre de recherche en cancérologie (CRC)
 Centre de recherche en économie agroalimentaire (CRÉA)
 Centre de recherche en endocrinologie moléculaire et oncologique (CREMO)
 Centre de recherche en géomatique (CRG)
 Centre de recherche en horticulture (CRH)
 Centre de recherche en infectiologie (CRI)
 Centre de recherche en modélisation, information et décision (CERMID)
 Centre de recherche en neurosciences (CRN)
 Centre de recherche en rhumatologie et immunologie (CRRI)
 Centre de recherche en sciences et ingénierie des macromolécules (CERSIM)
 Centre de recherche en sciences et technologie du lait (STELA)
 Centre de recherche et d'intervention sur la réussite scolaire (CRIRES)
 Centre de recherche et d'intervention sur l'éducation et la vie au travail (CRIEVAT)
 Centre de recherche Hôpital Laval
 Centre de recherche interdisciplinaire sur la violence familiale et la violence faite aux femmes (CRI-VIFF)
 Centre de recherche interuniversitaire sur la formation et la profession enseignante (CRIFPE)
 Centre de recherche interuniversitaire sur la littérature et la culture québécoises (CRILCQ)
 Centre de recherche interuniversitaire sur la mondialisation et le travail (CRIMT)
 Centre de recherche sur la fonction, la structure et l'ingénierie des protéines (CREFSIP)
 Centre de recherche sur l'adaptation des jeunes et des familles à risque (JEFAR)
 Centre de recherche sur l'aluminium (REGAL-LAVAL)
 Centre de recherche sur le bois (CRB)
 Centre de recherche sur le cerveau, le comportement et la neuropsychiatrie (CRCN)
 Centre de recherche sur le métabolisme énergétique (CREME)
 Centre de recherche sur les infrastructures en béton (CRIB)
 Centre de recherche sur les maladies lipidiques (CRML)
 Centre de recherche sur les propriétés des interfaces et la catalyse (CERPIC)
 Centre de recherche sur les technologies de l'organisation réseau (CENTOR)
 Centre de recherche Université Laval-Robert-Giffard (CRULRG)
 Centre de santé et de services sociaux de la Vieille-Capitale (CLSC Haute-Ville-Des-** Rivières) (CSSSVC)
 Centre d'édition et de documentation Fonds Gustave-Guillaume (FGG)
 Centre d'étude de la forêt (CEF)
 Centre d'études interaméricaines (CEI)
 Centre d'études Marie-de-l'Incarnation (CEMI)
 Centre d'études nordiques (CEN)
 Centre d'excellence pour la santé buccodentaire et le vieillissement
 Centre d'optique, photonique et laser (COPL)
 Centre hospitalier affilié universitaire de Québec (CHA)
 Centre hospitalier universitaire de Québec (CHUQ)
 Centre interdisciplinaire de recherche en réadaptation et intégration sociale (CIRRIS)
 Centre interdisciplinaire de recherches sur les activités langagières (CIRAL)
 Centre interuniversitaire de recherche sur le saumon atlantique (CIRSA)
 Centre interuniversitaire d'études et de recherches autochthones (CIÉRA)
 Centre interuniversitaire d'études québécoises (CIEQ)
 Centre interuniversitaire d'études sur les lettres, les arts et les traditions (CELAT)
 Centre interuniversitaire en calcul mathématique algébrique (CICMA)
 Centre interuniversitaire sur le risque, les politiques économiques et l'emploi (CIRPÉE)
 Centre jeunesse de Québec (CJQ)

University of Saskatchewan

Saskatoon, Saskatchewan

NSERC Funding 2006/7 C$M 26.5 
All Research Funding 2006/7 C$M 140.6

Number of Canada Research Chairs – 40

Internal Research Centers and Institutes (partial list)
 Canadian Centre for Health and Safety in Agriculture
 Canadian Centre for Nuclear Innovation
 Centre for High Performance Computing
 Global Institute for Food Security
 Institute For Computer and Information Technology
 Institute of Space and Atmospheric Studies
 Saskatchewan Drug Research Institute
 Saskatchewan Structural Sciences Centre
 Subatomic Physics Institute
 Toxicology Centre
 Plasma Physics Laboratory
 Saskatchewan Isotope Laboratory
 Research Centers and Institutes Operating with Independent Boards from The University
 Canadian Light Source – Synchrotron light source operated as a national facility
 Saskatchewan Population Health and Evaluation Research Unit, Inc.
 Vaccine and Infectious Disease Organization- Vaccine Research with Level 3 laboratory

Université de Montréal 

Montreal, Quebec.

NSERC Funding 2003: C$M 21,759

Number of Canada Research Chairs – 93

Centres de recherche
 Agora Jules Dupuit (AJD)
 Centre Canadien d'études allemandes et européennes (CCEAE)
 Centre d'études et de recherches internationales (CERIUM)
 Centre d'études ethniques des universités montréalaises (CEETUM)
 Centre d'étude des religions de l'Université de Montréal (CERUM)
 Centre d'excellence en neuromique (CEN)
 Centre d'excellence pour le développement des jeunes enfants (CEDJE)
 Centre de droit des affaires et du commerce international (CDACI)
 Centre de formation et d'expertise en recherche en administration des services infirmiers (FERASI)
 Centre de recherche en droit public (CRDP)
 Centre de recherche en éthique de l'Université de Montréal (CREUM)
 Centre de recherche en neuropsychologie et cognition (CERNEC)
 Centre de recherche en reproduction animale (CRRA)
 Centre de recherche en sciences neurologiques (CRSN)
 Centre de recherche interdisciplinaire sur la violence familiale et la violence faite aux ** femmes (CRI-VIFF)
 Centre de recherche interdisciplinaire sur les problèmes conjugaux et les aggressions ** sexuelles (CRIPCAS)
 Centre de recherche interdisciplinaire sur les technologies émergentes (CITÉ)
 Centre de recherche interuniversitaire sur la formation et la profession enseignante (CRIFPE)
 Centre de recherche interuniversitaire sur la littérature et la culture québécoises (CRILCQ/U.Montréal)
 Centre de recherche interuniversitaire sur la mondialisation et le travail (CRIMT)
 Centre de recherche Léa-Roback sur les inégalités sociales de santé de Montréal
 Centre de recherche sur l'intermédialité (CRI)
 Centre de recherche sur les politiques et le développement social (CPDS)
 Centre de recherche sur les transports (CRT)
 Centre de recherches mathématiques (CRM)
 Centre des langues patrimoniales (CLP)
 Centre international de criminologie comparée (CICC)
 Centre interuniversitaire d'études démographiques (CIED)
 Centre interuniversitaire de recherche en économie quantitative CIREQ-CRDE
 Centre interuniversitaire de recherche en toxicologie (CIRTOX)
 Centre interuniversitaire québécois de statistiques sociales (CIQSS)
 Centre Robert-Cedergren de l'Université de Montréal
 Équipe de recherche et d'action en santé mentale et culture (ÉRASME)

Groupes de recherche
 Groupe d'astrophysique de l'Université de Montréal
 Groupe d'étude des protéines membranaires (GÉPROM)
 Groupe d'étude et de recherche sur la sécurité internationale (GERSI)
 Groupe de physique des particules (GPP)
 Groupe de physique numérique (PhysNum)
 Groupe de physique numérique des matériaux
 Groupe de recherche DÉFI Apprentissage (GDA)
 Groupe de recherche Diversité Urbaine (GRDU)
 Groupe de recherche en architecture urbaine (GRAU)
 Groupe de recherche en conception assistée par ordinateur (GRCAO)
 Groupe de recherche en conservation de l'environnement bâti (GRCEB)
 Groupe de recherche en épidémiologie des zoonoses et santé publique
 Groupe de recherche en gestion thérapeutique (GRGT)
 Groupe de recherche en linguistique du texte (GRELT)
 Groupe de recherche en médecine équine du Québec (GREMEQ)
 Groupe de recherche en modélisation biomédicale (GRMB)
 Groupe de recherche en physique et technologie des couches minces (GCM)
 Groupe de recherche en sciences de la vision (GRSV)
 Groupe de recherche en toxicologie humaine (TOXHUM)
 Groupe de recherche et d'action sur la victimisation des enfants – Alliance de recherche ** pour le développement des enfants dans leur communauté (GRAVE-ARDEC)
 Groupe de recherche et développement en gestion informatisée de la santé animale (DSA R&D)
 Groupe de recherche IF (GRIF)
 Groupe de recherche interdépartemental sur les conditions d'enseignement et d'apprentissage ** (GRICEA)
 Groupe de recherche interdisciplinaire en santé (GRIS)
 Groupe de recherche interuniversitaire en sciences infirmières de Montréal (GRISIM)
 Groupe de recherche interuniversitaire en tutoriel intelligent (GRITI)
 Groupe de recherche Language, Organisation et Gouvernance (LOG)
 Groupe de recherche sur l'apprentissage et l'évaluation multimédias interactifs (GRAEMI)
 Groupe de recherche sur l'avènement et la formation des institutions cinématographique et ** scénique (GRAFICS)
 Groupe de recherche sur l'Amérique latine (GRAL)
 Groupe de recherche sur l'inadaptation psychosociale chez l'enfant (GRIP)
 Groupe de recherche sur la démographie québécoise (GRDQ)
 Groupe de recherche sur le système nerveux autonome (GRSNA)
 Groupe de recherche sur le système nerveux central (GRSNC)
 Groupe de recherche sur les animaux de compagnie (GRAC)
 Groupe de recherche sur les aspects sociaux de la santé et de la prévention (GRASP)
 Groupe de recherche sur les environnements de travail (GRET)
 Groupe de recherche sur les jeunes et les médias (GRJM)
 Groupe de recherche sur les maladies infectieuses du porc (GREMIP)
 Groupe de recherche universitaire sur le médicament (GRUM)
 Immigration et métropoles, Centre de recherche interuniversitaire de Montréal sur l'immigration, l'intégration et la dynamique urbaine

Institutes de recherche
 Institut d'études européennes de l'Université de Montréal et de l'Université McGill
 Institut de biotechnologie vétérinaire et alimentaire (IBVA)
 Institut de recherche en biologie végétale (IRBV)
 Institut de recherche en immunologie et en cancérologie de l'Université de Montréal (IRIC)
 Institut international de recherche en éthique biomédicale (IIREB)

Laboratoires de recherche
 Laboratoire d'intégration des technologies informatiques à l'enseignement médical (LITIEM)
 Laboratoire d'étude de l'architecture potentielle (LEAP)
 Laboratoire de muséographie
 Laboratoire de recherche et d'intervention portant sur les politiques et les professions en ** éducation (LABRIPROF)
 Laboratoire de recherche sur les musiques du monde (LRMM)
 Laboratoire de recherches métaboliques sur le foie et l'exercice
 Laboratoire LexUM

Observatoires de recherche
 Observatoire de linguistique Sens-Texte (OLST)
 Observatoire du mont Mégantic (OMM)
 Observatoire international de la création musicale (OICM)
 Observatoire SITQ du développement urbain et immobilier
 Observatoire sur la ville intérieure

Réseaux de recherche
 Calcul Québec
 Réseau Biocontrôle
 Réseau de calcul et de modélisation mathématique (RCM2)
 Réseau québécois de recherche en synthèse organique (RQRSO)
 Unité de santé internationale (USI)

Centres de recherche hospitaliers
 Centre de recherche de l'Institut de Cardiologie de Montréal (ICM)
 Centre de recherche de l'Institut Philippe-Pinel de Montréal
 Centre de recherche de l'Institut universitaire de gériatrie de Montréal
 Centre de recherche de l'Hôpital du Sacré-Coeur
 Centre de recherche du Centre hospitalier de l'UdeM (CRCHUM)
 Centre de recherche du CHU Sainte-Justine
 Centre de recherche Fernand-Seguin de l'Hôpital Louis-H. Lafontaine
 Centre de recherche Guy-Bernier Hôpital Maisonneuve-Rosemont
 Centre de recherche interdisciplinaire en réadaptation du Montréal métropolitain (CRIR)
 Institut de recherches cliniques de Montréal (IRCM)
 Laboratoire de génétique et médecine génomique en inflammation
 Service de recherche de l'hôpital Rivière-des-Prairies

Queen's University
Kingston, Ontario

NSERC Funding 2003: C$M 21,571

Number of Canada Research Chairs – 54

University centres and institutes
 Centre for Neuroscience Studies (formerly Centre for the Study of Molecular Neuroscience)
 Centre for Water and the Environment
 GeoEngineering Centre
 High Performance Computing Virtual Laboratory (HPCVL)
 Human Mobility Research Centre
 Sudbury Neutrino Observatory Institute
 Southern African Research Centre

Faculty centres and institutes 
 Cancer Research Institute
 (Cancer Clinical Trials Division)
 (Cancer Biology & Genetics Division)
 (Cancer Care & Epidemiology Division)
 Centre for Health Services and Policy Research
 Centre for International Relations Charles Pentland
 Centre for Manufacturing of Advanced Ceramics and Nanomaterials Vladimir Krstic
 Centre for Studies in Primary Care Richard Birtwhistle
 Centre for the Study of Democracy
 Fuel Cell Research Centre
 John Deutsch Institute for the Study of Economic Policy
 Industrial Relations Centre
 Institute for Intergovernmental Relations Thomas Courchene
 The Monieson Centre Yolande Chan
 Surveillance Studies Centre, David Murakami Wood

McMaster University
Hamilton, Ontario.
  
NSERC Funding 2003: C$M 20,694

Number of Canada Research Chairs – 62

Research institutes
 Origins Institute
 McMaster Institute for Applied Radiation Sciences(McIARS)
 McMaster Institute for Energy Studies
 McMaster Institute of Environment & Health
 Institute on Globalization and the Human Condition
 McMaster Institute for Molecular Biology & Biotechnology
 McMaster Institute for Polymer Production Technology
 McMaster Manufacturing Research Institute
 McMaster Palaeogenetics Institute (MPI)
 Population Health Research Institute (PHRI)
 Research Institute for Quantitative Studies in Economics & Population

Research centres
 Antimicrobial Research Centre
 Bertrand Russell Research Centre
 Brockhouse Institute for Materials Research
 Canadian Cochrane Centre
 CanChild Centre for Childhood Disability Research
 Centre for Advanced Polymer Processing & Design
 Centre for Electrophotonic Materials & Devices
 Centre for Functional Genomics
 Centre for Gene Therapeutics
 Centre for Evaluation of Medicines
 Centre for Health Economics and Policy Analysis
 Centre for Minimal Access Surgery
 Centre for Peace Studies
 Centre for Spatial Analysis
 Father Sean O'Sullivan Research Centre (St. Joseph's Hospital)
 Firestone Institute for Respiratory Health
 Henderson Research Centre
 Management of Innovation & New Technology Research Centre
 Mohawk-McMaster Institute for Applied Health Sciences
 McMaster Centre for Automotive Materials
 McMaster Ancient DNA Centre
 McMaster Centre for Pulp & Paper Research
 McMaster eBusiness Research Centre (MeRC)
 Network for Evaluation of Education and Training Technologies
 Offord Centre for Child Studies
 Population Health Research Institute
 R. Samuel McLaughlin Centre for Gerontological Health Research
 Research Centre for the Promotion of Women's Health
 Statistics Canada Research Data Centre
 Steel Research Centre
 Surgical Outcomes Research Centre

Research facilities
 Adaptive Systems Laboratory
 Applied Dynamics Laboratory
 Canadian International Labour Network
 Canadian Workers & Social Cohesion in a Global Era
 Communications Research Laboratory
 Earthquake Engineering Research Group
 Ecowise: The McMaster Eco-Research Program for Hamilton Harbour
 Flow Cytometry Facility
 Generalized Electronic Learning Group
 Geographical Information Systems Laboratory
 Health & Social Services Utilization Research Unit
 Health Information Research Unit
 High Throughput Screening Laboratory
 Independence and Economic Security of the Older Population
 Intestinal Disease Research Program
 Machining Systems Laboratory
 McMaster Advanced Control Consortium
 McMaster Experimental Economics Laboratory
 McMaster Health Sciences International
 McMaster Membrane Research Group
 McMaster Nuclear Reactor
 McMaster Working Group on the Middle Ages and Renaissance
 Mobix Lab
 Nursing Effectiveness, Utilization & Outcomes Research Unit
 Power Research Laboratory
 Program for Educational Research and Development
 Program in Policy Decision Making
 Robotics and Manufacturing Research Laboratory
 SHARCNET
 Smooth Muscle Research Program
 Social and Economic Dimensions of an Aging Population
 Software Engineering Research Group
 Supportive Cancer Care Research Unit
 Water Resources Environmental Information Systems Laboratory
 Walter W. Smeltzer Corrosion Laboratory
 William J. McCallion Planetarium
 Work Function Unit at the School of Rehabilitation Science

University of Manitoba

Winnipeg, Manitoba

NSERC Funding 2009/10 C$M 19.9

Number of Canada Research Chairs – 44

University research centres, institutes, facilities and groups
 Aerospace Materials Engineering Facility
 Applied Electromagnetics Facility
 Canadian Centre for Agri-food Research in Health and Medicine (with St. Boniface General Hospital and Agriculture and Agri-food Canada)
 Canadian Wheat Board Centre for Grain Storage Research
 Centre for Aboriginal Health Research (with Health Sciences Centre)
 Centre for Architectural Structures and Technology (C.A.S.T.)
 Centre for Defence and Security Studies
 Centre for Earth Observation Science (CEOS)
 Centre for Global Public Health
 Centre for Globalization and Cultural Studies
 Centre for Hellenic Civilization
 Centre for Higher Education Research and Development (CHERD)
 Centre for Human Models of Disease
 Centre for Professional and Applied Ethics
 Centre for the Research and Treatment of Atherosclerosis
 Centre on Aging
 Crystallography and Mineralogy Research Facility
 Digital Image Analysis Facility
 Great-West Life Manitoba Breast Cancer Research and Diagnosis Centre (with CancerCare Manitoba)
 Health, Leisure and Human Performance Research Institute
 Institute of Cardiovascular Sciences (with St. Boniface General Hospital)
 Institute for the Humanities
 Institute of Industrial Mathematical Sciences
 Internet Innovation Centre
 Legal Research Institute
 Manitoba Centre for Health Policy
 Manitoba Centre for Proteomics and Systems Biology (with Health Sciences Centre)
 Manitoba Institute of Cell Biology (with CancerCare Manitoba)
 Manitoba Centre for Nursing and Health Research (MCNHR)
 Manitoba Institute for Materials
 Manitoba Regional Materials and Surface Characterization Facility
 Manitoba Research Data Centre
 National Centre for Livestock and the Environment
 Nuclear Magnetic Resonance (NMR) Facility
 RESOLVE (Prairie  Research Network on Family Violence)
 Richardson Centre for Functional Foods and Nutraceuticals (RCFFN)
 Spinal Cord Research Centre
 Transport Institute
 Winnipeg Institute for Theoretical Physics (with University of Winnipeg)
 W.R. McQuade Structural Engineering Laboratory

Research groups include: 
 Aquatic Biology Research Group
 Community Acquired Infections Research Group
 Composite Materials and Structures Group
 Developmental Health Research Group
 Mood and Anxiety Disorders Research Group
 Psychiatric Neuroimaging Research Group

Centres of Excellence
 Allergen
 ArcticNet
 Auto21
 Canadian Arthritis Network
 Canadian Stroke Network
 Canadian Water Network
 GEOIDE
 Graphics, Animation and New Media Canada
 PrioNet Canada
 MITACS

University of Calgary

Calgary, Alberta.
  
NSERC Funding 2003: C$M 19,714

Number of Canada Research Chairs – 75

University research institutes and centres
 Alberta Global Forum
 Calgary Centre for Financial Research – under development
 Calgary Centre for Innovative Technology (CCIT)
 Calgary Institute for the Humanities]
 Canadian Centre for the Study of Higher Education
 Centre for Advanced Technologies of Life Sciences (CAT)
 Centre for Bioengineering Research and Education (CBRE)
 Centre for Environmental Engineering Research and Education (CEERE)
 Centre for Gifted Education
 Centre for Health and Policy Studies (CHAPS)
 Centre for Information Security and Cryptography
 Centre for Innovation Studies (THECIS)
 Centre for Mathematics in Life Sciences
 Centre for Microsystems Engineering (CME)
 Centre for Military and Strategic Studies (CMSS)
 Centre for Public Interest Accounting (CPIA)
 Centre for Research in the Fine Arts (CRFA)
 Centre for Social Work Research and Development
 iNFORMATICS Research Centre
 Institute for Advanced Policy Research
 Institute for Biocomplexity and Informatics
 Institute for Gender Research
 Institute for Quantum Science and Technology (formerly the Institute for Quantum Information Science)
 Institute for Space Research
 Institute for Sustainable Energy, Environment and Economy
 Institute for United States Policy Research
 Institute of Professional Communication (IPC)
 International Institute for Resource Industries and Sustainable Studies (IRIS)
 Kananaskis Field Stations
 Language Research Centre
 Latin American Research Centre (LARC)
 Markin Institute for Public Health
 Pipeline Engineering Centre (PEC)
 Risk Studies Centre
 World Tourism Education and Research Centre

Partnerships, institutes and centres
 Alberta Bone & Joint Health Institute
 Alberta Civil Liberties Research Centre
 Alberta Gaming Research Institute (AGRI)]
 Alberta Sulpher Research Ltd.
 Alberta Synchrotron Institute (ASI)
 Arctic Institute of North America
 Bamfield Marine Sciences Centre
 Banff International Research Station]
 Canadian Energy Research Institute (CERI)]
 Canadian Institute of Resources Law]
 Canadian Research Institute for Law and the Family
 Centre for Leadership and Learning
 Hotchkiss Brain Institute
 Institute of Health Economics (IHE)
 Institute of Infection, Immunity & Inflammation
 Institute of Maternal and Child Health
 Libin Cardiovascular Institute of Alberta
 Macleod Institute for Environmental Analysis
 McCaig Institute for Bone and Joint Health
 Pacific Institute for Mathematical Sciences
 Pine Creek Research Centre for Sustainable Water Resources
 Prairie Regional Data Centre]
 Research and Education for Solutions to Violence and Abuse (RESOLVE)
 Southern Alberta Cancer Research Institute]
 Telecommunications Research Laboratories (TRLabs)
 Van Horne Institute for International Transportation
 Vocational and Rehabilitation Research Institute, The (VRRI)

Centres of Excellence
 AUTO21
 Canadian Arthritis Network
 Canadian Bacterial Diseases Network (CBDN)
 Canadian Genetic Diseases Network (CGDN)
 Canadian Language & Literacy Research Network
 Canadian Stroke Network (CSN)
 Canadian Water Network (CWN)
 Institute for Robotics and Intelligent Systems (IRIS)
 Intelligent Sensing for Innovative Structures (ISIS)
 Mathematics of Information Technology and Complex Systems
 Micronet – Microelectronic Devices, Circuits and Systems
 PrioNet Canada
 PENCE Inc. Protein Engineering Network
 Stem Cell Network (STEMNet)
 Sustainable Forest Management Network (SFM)
 TeleLearning Network

University of Western Ontario

London, Ontario.
  
NSERC Funding 2003: C$M 17,288

Number of Canada Research Chairs – 61

Science research centres and facilities
 The Biotron Institute for Experimental Climate Change Research
 CCP Centre for Interdisciplinary Studies in Chemical Physics
 ERW Environmental Research Western
 ISW Interface Science Western
 Laboratory for Stable Isotope Science
 The Nanofabrication Laboratory
 ORCCA Ontario Research Centre for Computer Algebra
 POLARIS Portable Observatories for Lithosphere Analysis and Research
 SHARCNET Shared Hierarchical Academic Research Computing Network
 SSW Surface Science Western
 WINS Western Institute for Nanomaterials Science

Engineering research centres
 Advanced Fluid Mechanics Research Group
 Biomaterials and Medical Devices Research Group BM2D
 Biomedical Engineering
 Boundary Layer Wind Tunnel Laboratory
 Chemical Reactor Engineering Centre (CREC)
 Concurrent Engineering and Agile Manufacturing
 ECE Robotics and Real-Time Systems Lab
 Environmental Research Western
 Facility for Intelligent Decision Support (FIDS)
 Geotechnical Research Centre
 Institute for Catastrophic Loss Reduction (ICLR)
 Multi-Disciplinary Accident Research Team
 Optomechatronics Research Laboratory
 SHARCNet
 The Three Little Pigs Research Project at The Insurance Research Lab for Better Homes
 Western Fluidization Group

Health science research facilities
 Faculty Research Centres
 National Centre for Audiology
 Canadian Centre for Activity & Aging
 www.uwo.ca/actage
 www.ccaa-outreach.com
 International Centre for Olympic Studies
 Additional Research Facilities
 Kid Skills Research Laboratory
 National Rowing Centre
 Nursing Research Unit
 Western Qualitative Health Research Network
 The R. Samuel McLaughlin Foundation Exercise & Pregnancy Laboratory (EPL)
 Research Facilities
 School of Communication Sciences & Disorders
 School of Kinesiology
 School of Nursing
 School of Occupational Therapy
 School of Physical Therapy
 Canadian Language & Literacy Research Network (CLLRNet)

Social science research centres and research groups

 Aging and Health Research Centre
 Allan O'Brien Multilevel Governance Laboratory
 American Studies
 Animal Cognition Research Group
 Behavioural Neuroendocrinology Research Group
 Canadian Language and Literacy Research Network (collaborative)
 Centre for Avian Physiology, Neurobiology and Behavior
 Centre for the Brain and Mind
 Centre for the Study of International Economic Relations (CSIER)
 Centre for the Study of Theory and Criticism
 Child Development Research Facility
 CIBC Human Capital and Productivity Project
 CIHR Group for Action and Perception
 Culture, Cognition and Behavior Research Group (a collaboration with Sociology and Anthropology)
 Institute for Catastrophic Loss Reduction
 Intergroup Relations and Social Justice Research Group
 Kilee Patchell-Evans Autism Research Group
 Moral, Political and Legal Philosophy Research Group
 Nationalism and Ethnic Conflict Research Group
 Philosophy and Psychology Research Group (a collaboration with Philosophy)
 Political Economy Research Group (PERG)
 Population Studies Centre
 Psychoneuroimmunology Research Group
 Research Unit for Work and Productivity
 RBC Financial Group Economic Policy Research Institute (EPRI)
 Self-Regulation Research Group (collaboration for Social, Development, Clinical and Behavioral and Cognitive Neuroscience areas)
 The Aboriginal Policy Research Consortium
 Transition Economies Research Forum (TERF)
 Workforce Aging in the New Economy

Affiliated research institutes
 Robarts Research Institute
 Lawson Health Research Institute
 London Regional Cancer Program

Dalhousie University
Halifax, Nova Scotia.
  
NSERC Funding 2003: C$M 14,839

Number of Canada Research Chairs – 50

Research centres, institutes, and groups 
 Atlantic Centre of Excellence for Women's Health
 Atlantic Health Promotion Research Centre
 Atlantic Institute of Criminology
 Atlantic Research Data Centre (ARDC)
 Centre for African Studies
 Centre for Foreign Policy Studies
 Dalhousie Infectious Disease Research Alliance (DIDRA)
 Dalhousie Inflammation Group
 Dalhousie Multiple Sclerosis Research Unit
 Energy at Dalhousie
 Health Law Institute
 International Ocean Institute
 Law and Technology Institute
 Marine and Environmental Law Institute
 Neuroscience Institute
 Pediatric Pain Research Lab
 Population Health Research Unit (PHRU)
 Institute for Research in Materials

Technical research facilities 
 Aquatron
 Atlantic Region Magnetic Resonance Centre
 Canadian Institute of Fisheries Technology (CIFT)
 Canadian Residential Energy End-use Data and Analysis Center (CREEDAC)
 Centre for Water Resources Studies (CWRS)
 Cosmogenic Nuclide Exposure Dating Facility
 Minerals Engineering Centre (MEC)
 Nova Scotia CAD/CAM Centre (NSCCC)
 Slowpoke Facility
 Trace Analysis Research Centre (TARC)

Affiliated research organizations 
 IWK Health Centre
 Global Information Networking Institute
 The Nova Scotia Hospital,
 QEII Health Sciences Centre
 Saint John Regional Hospital

University of Ottawa

Ottawa, Ontario.

NSERC Funding 2003: C$M 14,127

Number of Canada Research Chairs – 49

uOttawa research centres and institutes 
 Centre for Advanced Research in Environmental Genomics (CAREG)
 Centre for Catalysis Research and Innovation
 Centre for Hazard Mitigation and Emergency Management
 Centre for Interdisciplinary Research on Citizenship and Minority Studies (CIRCEM)
 Centre for Neural Dynamics
 Centre for Research in Biopharmaceuticals and Biotechnology
 Centre for Research in Photonics
Centre for Research on Educational and Community Services (CRECS)
 Centre for Research on Environmental Microbiology (CREM)
 Centre for Research on French Canadian Culture
 Centre on Governance
 CGA Accounting Research Centre
 CGA Tax Research Centre
 Human Rights Research and Education Centre
 Institute for the Prevention of Crime (IPC)
 Institute of Canadian Studies
 Institute of Population Health
 Institute of the Environment
 Institute for Science, Society and Policy
 Institute of Women's Studies
 Research Centre for Sport in Canadian Society
 University of Ottawa Centre for Neuromuscular Disease

Affiliated research institutes 
 Kidney Research Centre
 Ottawa Hospital Research Institute (OHRI)
 University of Ottawa Eye Institute
 The Ottawa Hospital Regional Cancer Centre
 University of Ottawa Heart Institute
 Children's Hospital of Eastern Ontario Research Institute
 Institute of Mental Health Research
 Élisabeth Bruyère Research Institute

University of Guelph

Guelph, Ontario.

Number of Canada Research Chairs – 39
UoG ranks 14th among the top 50 research universities in Canada, but is not a member of U15.

Research Centres, Institutes and Groups 
Guelph-Waterloo Center for Graduate Work in Chemistry and Biochemistry (GWC2)
Guelph-Waterloo Physics Institute (GWPI)
Advanced Analysis Centre
Advanced Foods and Materials Network (AFMNet)
Advanced Robotics & Intelligent Systems Lab
Agri-Technology Commercialization Centre
Aquaculture Centre
AquaSanitas – A Centre for Water Safety and Security
Arboretum Gene Bank
Axelrod Institute of Ichthyology
Bioconversion Network
Biophysics Interdepartmental Group (BIG)
Biodiversity Institute of Ontario
Bioproducts Discovery and Development Centre
Business Development Office
Centre for the Study of Animal Welfare
Canadian Agricultural Trade Policy and Competitive Research Network
Canadian Arthritis Network Core Facility
Canadian Co-operative Wildlife Health Centre
Canadian Language and Literacy Research Network
Canadian Pollination Initiative
Canadian Research Institute in Food Safety (CRIFS)
Centre for Agricultural Renewable Energy and Sustainability
Centre for Biodiversity Genomics
Centre for Food and Soft Materials Science
Centre for the Genetic Improvement of Livestock
Centre for Land and Water Stewardship
Centre for Nutrition Modelling
Centre for Psychological Services
Centre for Public Health and Zoonoses
Controlled Environment Systems Research Facility
Couple and Family Therapy Centre
Electrochemical Technology Centre
Food Safety Network
Genomics Facility/Advanced Analysis Centre
Guelph Food Technology Centre (GFTC)
Guelph Transgenic Plant Research Complex
Guelph Turfgrass Institute (GTI)
Hagen Aqualab
Health and Performance Centre
Human Nutraceutical Research Unit
Institute for Comparative Cancer Investigation
Institute for Robotics & Intelligent Systems
International Leadership Research Network
Laboratory Services
Landscape Architecture Community Outreach Centre
Mathematics of Information Technology and Complex Systems
Metals in the Human Environment Research Network
Nuclear Magnetic Resonance Centre
Organization and Management Solution
Ontario Rural Wastewater Centre
Poultry Welfare Centre
Research Programs (U of G / OMAFRA enhanced partnership)
Shared Hierarchical Academic Research Computing Network
Sudbury Neutrino Observatory
TransCanada Institute
Urban Systems Environment Design Centre
Veterinary Teaching Hospital
Weather Innovation Centre

Networks of Centers of Excellence

Health and life sciences 
 Accel-Rx Health Sciences Accelerator – Accel-Rx (2014–2019) – Vancouver, British Columbia,
 Aging Gracefully across Environments using Technology to Support Wellness, Engagement and Long Life – AGE-WELL (2014–2019) – Toronto Rehabilitation Institute – University Health Network, Toronto, Ontario,
 Allergy, Genes and Environment Network – AllerGen (2004–2019) – McMaster University, Hamilton, Ontario,
 Biotherapeutics for Cancer Treatment – BioCanRx (2014–2019) – Ottawa Hospital Research Institute, Ottawa, Ontario,
 Canadian Frailty Network – CFN (2012–2017) – Queen's University, Kingston, Ontario,
 Canadian Glycomics Network – GlycoNet (2014–2019) – University of Alberta, Edmonton, Alberta,
 Cardiac Arrhythmia Network of Canada – CANet (2014–2019) – Western University, London, Ontario,
 CellCAN Regenerative Medicine and Cell Therapy Network – CellCAN (2014–2018) – Hôpital Maisonneuve-Rosemont, Montréal, Quebec,
 Centre for Commercialization of Cancer Immunotherapy – C3i (2016–2021) – Montréal, Quebec,
 Centre for Commercialization of Regenerative Medicine – CCRM (2011–2017) – Toronto, Ontario,
 Centre for Drug Research and Development – CDRD (2008–2018) – Vancouver, British Columbia,
 Centre for Imaging Technology Commercialization – CIMTEC (2011–2018) – London, Ontario,
 Centre for Probe Development and Commercialization – CPDC (2008–2018) – Hamilton, Ontario,
 Centre for Surgical Invention and Innovation – CSII (2009–2017) – Hamilton, Ontario,
 Centre for the Commercialization of Antibodies and Biologics – CCAB (2014–2019) – Toronto, Ontario,
 Children and Youth in Challenging Contexts – CYCC (2011–2019) – Dalhousie University, Halifax, Nova Scotia,
 CQDM (2009–2017) – Montréal, Quebec,
 Exactis Innovation – Exactis (2014–2019) – Montreal, Quebec,
 MedDev Commercialization Centre – MDCC (2014–2019) – University of Ottawa Heart Institute, Ottawa, Ontario,
 NEOMED (2014–2018) – Montréal, Quebec,
 NeuroDevNet (2009–2019) – University of British Columbia, Vancouver, British Columbia,
 Pan-Provincial Vaccine Enterprise – PREVENT (2008–2017) – Saskatoon, Saskatchewan,
 Promoting Relationships and Eliminating Violence Network – PREVNet (2005–2009) – Queen's University, Kingston, Ontario and York University, Toronto, Ontario,
 Stem Cell Network – SCN (2000–2011) – University of Ottawa, Ottawa, Ontario,
 The Prostate Centre's Translational Research Initiative for Accelerated Discovery and Development – PC-TRiADD (2008–2018) – Vancouver, British Columbia,
 Translating Emergency Knowledge for Kids – TREKK (2011–2019) – University of Manitoba, Winnipeg, Manitoba

Information and communication 
 Canadian Digital Media Network – CDMN (2009–2019) – Kitchener, Ontario,
 Centre of Excellence in Next Generation Networks – CENGN (2014–2019) – Ottawa, Ontario,
 MiQro Innovation Collaborative Centre – C2MI (2011–20121) – Bromont, Quebec,
 Smart Cybersecurity Network – SERENE-RISC (2014–2018) – Université de Montréal, Montréal, Quebec,
 Wavefront (2011–20121) – Vancouver, British Columbia

Environment 
 ArcticNet (2003–2018) – Université Laval, Québec, Quebec
 Canadian Water Network – CWN (2001–2017) – University of Waterloo, Waterloo, Ontario
 Green Aviation Research and Development Network – GARDN (2009–2018) – Montréal, Quebec,
 Marine Environmental, Observation, Prediction and Response Network – MEOPAR (2012–2017) – Dalhousie University, Halifax, Nova Scotia,
 Ocean Networks Canada Innovation Centre – ONC Innovation Centre (2009–2018) – Victoria, British Columbia

Natural resources 
 BioFuelNet (2012–2017) – McGill University, Montréal, Quebec,
 Leading Operational Observations and Knowledge for the North – LOOKNorth (2011–2020) – St. John's, Newfoundland and Labrador,
 TECTERRA (2009–2016) – Calgary, Alberta,
 Ultra Deep Mining Network – UDMN (2014–2018) – Sudbury, Ontario

Manufacturing and engineering 
 Refined Manufacturing Acceleration Process – ReMAP (2014–2018) – Toronto, Ontario

Cross-sectoral 
 Advanced Applied Physics Solutions Inc. – AAPS (2008–2017) – Vancouver, British Columbia,
 GreenCentre Canada – GCC (2009–2019) – Kingston, Ontario,
 India-Canada Centre for Innovative Multidisciplinary Partnerships to Accelerate Community Transformation and Sustainability – IC-IMPACTS (2012–2017), University of British Columbia, Vancouver, British Columbia,
 MaRS Innovation – MI (2008–2017) – Toronto, Ontario,
 Natural Products Canada – NPC (2016–2021) – Charlottetown, Prince Edward Island

Notable university-related research organizations and projects

Domestic
 Perimeter Institute for Theoretical Physics – University of Waterloo, Waterloo, Ontario
 Organization for the theoretical study of gravity, quantum mechanics and cosmology
 Canadian Institute for Advanced Research – HQ, Toronto, Ontario
 A virtual institute for the study of cosmology, gravity, geology, biology, nanotechnology and other advanced scientific topics
 Sudbury Neutrino Observatory – Sudbury, Ontario
 Underground observatory for the study of neutrinos
 Tri-University Meson Facility (TRIUMF) – University of British Columbia, Vancouver, British Columbia
 Particle accelerator for the study of mesons
 Remotely Operated Platform for Ocean Science (ROPOS)
 Robotic study of Canada's Pacific Ocean floor
 Lithoprobe
 Canada's largest earth sciences project involving researchers from universities, the private sector and the federal government.
 Globec Canada
 Project for the study of the effect of environmental change on ocean life.
 Ottawa Hospital Research Institute
 A key medical research centre with a focus on cancer research, specifically the use of oncolytic viruses.

International
High Energy Physics – CERN (Geneva) the Large Hadron Collider and the Atlas Experiment
 Canada's participation in the world's largest physics project coordinated by the TRIUMF Particle Physics Research Centre at the University of British Columbia in Vancouver.
 The Gemini Project
 Canada's participation in the construction of large astronomical telescopes in Hawaii and Chile.
 Canada and the Ocean Drilling Project
 Canada's participation in an international programme studying the Earth's crust under the oceans.
 The North Water Project
 Canada's participation in an international project studying open water areas of the Arctic Ocean

Research and development expenditures in Canada by sector

Canadian Gross Expenditure on R&D (GERD) by Performing Sectors – 2006 Estimates, C$ Millions

 Business Enterprises:   14,850,    52.4%
 Higher Education:   10,890,    38.4%
 Federal Government:   2,145,    7.6%
 Provincial Government:   345,    1.2%
 Provincial Research Organizations:   127,    0.4%
 Total:   28,357,    100.0%

Support organizations

 Natural Sciences and Engineering Research Council – Ottawa, Ontario (Federal government funding agency for Canadian university research)
 Canadian Institutes of Health Research
 Social Sciences and Humanities Research Council of Canada – Ottawa, Ontario (Federal government funding agency for Canadian university research)
 Canada Research Chair – Ottawa, Ontario (Federal government funding agency for special Canadian university research staffing)
 Canadian Foundation for Innovation – Ottawa, Ontario (Federal government funding agency for research infrastructure for Canadian universities, colleges, research hospitals, and non-profit research institutions)
 CANARIE, Canadian Advanced Network and Research for Industry and Education
 Foundations in Canada – This is a list of philanthropic organizations in Canada. A number of these organization make financial contributions to university research in Canada.

See also

 Canadian government scientific research organizations
 Canadian industrial research and development organizations
 U15 (universities)
 List of Canadian nuclear facilities
 Science and technology in Canada
 Royal Society of Canada

References

 Public web site of the Natural Sciences and Engineering Research Council of Canada
 NSERC.gc.ca
 Web sites for the "Group of Thirteen" Canada's largest research universities

Scientific organizations based in Canada
Higher education in Canada